Free to Stay is the follow-up LP to Smoosh's 2004's release of She Like Electric. The album was released on June 6, 2006.

Track listing

External links
"Find a Way" video and mp3 
Yu, Kathryn (June 12, 2006). "A Timely Bit of Ageless Pop". Song of the Day. NPR.
Tyrangiel, Josh (September 10, 2006). "5 Captivating New Albums For -- and By -- All Ages". Time. 

2006 albums
Smoosh albums